Craig Lee Brackins (born October 9, 1987) is an American professional basketball player who last played for Shiga Lakestars of the Japanese B.League.

Brackins played collegiately for the Iowa State Cyclones. A power forward, Brackins was the highest-touted recruit to choose Iowa State after spending time at Brewster Academy in New Hampshire. In March 2009, Brackins was predicted to be a first-round draft pick in the 2009 NBA draft. He was picked by the Oklahoma City Thunder with the 21st overall pick in the 2010 NBA draft.  He was immediately traded to the New Orleans Hornets, and he was later traded to the Philadelphia 76ers.

College career

2008–09 season
Craig Brackins rose to national prominence following a game in January, 2009 against Kansas in which he scored 42 points and grabbed 14 rebounds, despite Iowa State losing 82–67 to the Jayhawks.

2009–10 season
Brackins scored 28 points and grabbed 12 rebounds in a 96–55 blowout of Mississippi Valley State on November 22, 2009.  He declared himself eligible for the 2010 NBA draft on March 12, 2010.

Professional career
He was drafted with the 21st pick by the Oklahoma City Thunder at the 2010 NBA draft in June. On July 8, 2010, he was traded, along with fellow rookie Quincy Pondexter, to the New Orleans Hornets in exchange for the rights to Cole Aldrich and Morris Peterson.

On September 23, 2010, he was again traded, along with Darius Songaila, to the Philadelphia 76ers in exchange for Willie Green and Jason Smith.

On November 30, 2010, Brackins was assigned to the Springfield Armor of the NBA Development League. In 5 games with the Armor, Brackins averaged 17.2 points and 8.6 rebounds. On December 12, 2010 he was recalled to the 76ers. He was sent back to Springfield on January 15, 2011, then recalled by the 76ers on February 7, 2011. He was sent back for another stint with the Armor on March 24, 2011.

In August 2011, Brackins signed with Maccabi Ashdod B.C. of Israel due to the 2011 NBA lockout. His contract expired in November, 2011.

In February 2012, Brackins was assigned to the Maine Red Claws. He was recalled on March 2, 2012.

On July 5, 2012 the Boston Celtics announced that Brackins was added to their roster for the 2012 Orlando Pro Summer League and the 2012 NBA Summer League.

Brackins signed with Angelico Biella of Italy later that summer. He left Angelico in December 2012.

On March 13, 2013, he was acquired by the Los Angeles D-Fenders of the NBA D-League.

On July 25, 2013, Brackins signed with Stelmet Zielona Góra.

NBA career statistics

Regular season

|-
| style="text-align:left;"| 
| style="text-align:left;"| Philadelphia
| 3 || 0 || 11.0 || .250 || .000 || .000 || 1.3 || .3 || .3 || .0 || 2.7
|-
| style="text-align:left;"| 
| style="text-align:left;"| Philadelphia
| 14 || 1 || 6.3 || .273 || .333 || .500 || 1.1 || .6 || .0 || .1 || 1.6
|-
| style="text-align:left;"| Career
| style="text-align:left;"| 
| 17 || 1 || 7.1 || .265 || .214 || .500 || 1.1 || .5 || .1 || .1 || 1.8

References

1987 births
Living people
American expatriate basketball people in China
American expatriate basketball people in Israel
American expatriate basketball people in Italy
American expatriate basketball people in Japan
American expatriate basketball people in Poland
American expatriate basketball people in Turkey
American men's basketball players
Basketball players from Los Angeles
Basket Zielona Góra players
Brewster Academy alumni
Eskişehir Basket players
Iowa State Cyclones men's basketball players
Koshigaya Alphas players
Los Angeles D-Fenders players
Maccabi Ashdod B.C. players
Maine Red Claws players
Nagoya Diamond Dolphins players
Oklahoma City Thunder draft picks
Pallacanestro Biella players
Philadelphia 76ers players
Power forwards (basketball)
Shiga Lakes players
Springfield Armor players
Universiade bronze medalists for the United States
Universiade medalists in basketball
Medalists at the 2009 Summer Universiade